Soulstream may refer to:
 Soulstream (Holly Johnson album), 1999
 Soul Stream, a 1963 album by George Braith